The 1945 National Challenge Cup was the 32nd edition of the United States Football Association's annual open cup.  Brookhattan was the winner and the Cleveland Americans were the runners-up.

External links

1945 National Challenge Cup – TheCup.us

Lamar Hunt U.S. Open Cup
U.S. Open Cup